Victor Moses Yates (15 June 1939 – 31 August 2008) was a New Zealand rugby footballer who represented his country in rugby union. His brother, John, represented New Zealand in rugby league while his father, Moses, represented North Auckland in rugby union.

Rugby union career
Yates attended Kaitaia College and played rugby union for North Auckland, being part of the side that won the Ranfurly Shield in 1960.

He played nine matches including three Tests for the All Blacks in 1961 and 1962.

In an interview in L'Équipe on the 6th of September 2017, french international Pierre Albaladejo named him as the greatest player against whom he ever played.

Rugby league career
He later switched to rugby league, playing for the Ponsonby Ponies and representing Auckland in 1966, 1967 and 1968.

References

External links 
 

1939 births
2008 deaths
New Zealand rugby union players
New Zealand international rugby union players
New Zealand rugby league players
Ponsonby Ponies players
Auckland rugby league team players
North Island rugby union players
Māori All Blacks players
New Zealand Māori rugby league players
Rugby league second-rows
Northland rugby union players
People from Kaitaia